Beran Selo (Serbian Cyrillic: Беран Село) is a neighborhood of the city of Berane in north-eastern Montenegro.

Demographics
According to the 2011 census, its population was 1,832.

Features
Beran Selo (or Beranselo) is the center of the Serb Orthodox Eparchy of Budimlje-Nikšić in Montenegro, because of monastery Đurđevi Stupovi.

References

Populated places in Berane Municipality
Serb communities in Montenegro